Atonement in Judaism is the process of causing a transgression to be forgiven or pardoned.

In Rabbinic Judaism 
In Rabbinic Judaism, atonement is achieved through repentance, which can be followed by some combination of the following:
 confession 
 restitution
 the occurrence of Yom Kippur (the day itself, as distinct from the Temple service performed on it)
 tribulations (unpleasant life experiences)
 the experience of dying.
 the carrying out of a sentence of lashes or execution imposed by an ordained court (not now in existence)
 Temple service (not now in existence, e.g. bringing a sacrifice).

Which of these additions are required varies according to the severity of the sin, whether it was done willfully, in error, or under duress, whether it was against God alone or also against a fellow person, and whether the Temple service and ordained law courts are in existence or not. Repentance is needed in all cases of willful sin, and restitution is always required in the case of sin against a fellow person, unless the wronged party waives it.

According to Maimonides, the requirements for atonement of various sins between man and God are as follows:

The sentence of an ordained court (when available) can also substitute for Yom Kippur + tribulations + dying.

In Judaism, once a person has repented, they can be close to and beloved of God, even if their atonement is not yet complete.

True repentance
The Mishnah states:

According to Maimonides, in order to achieve true repentance the sinner must abandon their sin, remove it from their thoughts, and resolve in their heart never to repeat it, as it is said, “Let the wicked forsake his way and the man of iniquity his thoughts" (Isaiah 55:7). Likewise, they must regret the past, as it is said, "Surely after I turned I repented" (Jeremiah 31:18). They must also call Him who knows all secrets to witness that they will never return to this sin again.

Lashes (Makkot)

The third chapter of tractate Makkot enumerates 59 offenses, each entailing lashes. Anyone guilty of a sin which is punished by Kareth ("excision") may be atoned by receiving these lashes. The author of this teaching, Hanina bar Gamaliel, adds: "If by the commission of a single sin one forfeits his soul before God, then all the more so by a single meritorious deed (such as voluntary submission to punishment) his soul should be saved."

Execution

The Pentateuch specifies capital punishment, as opposed to private retribution or vengeance, for the following crimes: adultery (Lev. 20:10; Deut. 22:22); bestiality (Ex. 22:18 [A. V. 19]; Lev. 20:15); blasphemy (Lev. 24:16); false evidence (intended to lead to a conviction) in capital cases (Deut. 19:16-19); false prophecy (Deut. 13:6, 18:20); idolatry or inciting others to the same (Lev. 20:2; Deut. 13:7-19, 17:2-7); incestuous or unnatural connections (Lev. 18:22, 20:11-14); insubordination to supreme authority (Deut. 17:12); kidnapping (Ex. 21:16; Deut. 24:7); licentiousness of a priest's daughter (Lev. 21:9); murder (Ex. 21:12; Lev. 24:17; Num. 35:16 et seq.); rape committed on a betrothed woman (Deut. 22:25-27) or fornication by or with her (Deut. 22:20, 23–24); striking or cursing a parent, or otherwise rebelling against parental authority (Ex. 21:15,17; Lev. 20:9; Deut. 21:18-21); Sabbath-breaking (Ex. 31:14, 35:2; Num. 15:32-36); witchcraft and augury (Ex. 22:17; Lev. 20:27).

In other Jewish denominations 

Some Jewish denominations may differ with Rabbinic Judaism on the importance or mechanics of atonement. Consult the articles on specific denominations for details.

References 

Judaism
Jewish theology